Dr. Julie Kent (born 1957) is a Professor of Sociology at the University of the West of England.

Career 
Kent obtained her Bachelors of Science in Sociology degree from the University of Bath in 1990. She then later graduated from the University of Bristol with a PhD in sociology in 1995, and in 2007 became a professor of Sociology of Health Technology. Kent was a member of the Medicines and Healthcare Products Regulatory Agency  (MRHA) Committee on Safety Devices and is now Chair of the University Research Ethics Committee at the University of the West of England.

At the 2006 Stem Cell Ethics Workshop in London, Kent gave a lecture on ethics and regulations in the world of the fetus alongside Professor Naomi Pfeffer.

In late 2012, along with Dr. Maria Fannin from the University of Bristol, Kent won a grant from the Wellcome Trust to fund a research project into placental tissue.

Kent has received more than £224,000 from the Economic and Social Research Council. One grant was worth more than £79,000 for research into tissue and cell technologies, and another was worth more than £145,000 for fetal stem cell research.

Bibliography

Books

Book chapters

Journal articles

Contributions 
 Webster, Andrew. New Technologies in Health Care: Challenge, Change and Innovation. Basingstoke: Palgrave Macmillan, 2006. Print.

See also

Gender studies
Bioethics   
Cell therapy 
Feminist bioethics
Biobased economies
Placenta
Stem cell research

References

External links
Official site

1957 births
Date of birth missing (living people)
Place of birth missing (living people)
Academics of the University of the West of England, Bristol
Bioethicists
British feminists
British women academics
British sociologists
British women's rights activists
Living people
British women sociologists